Huan may refer to:

People
 Marquis Huan of Cai (died 695 BC), ruler of Cai
 King Huan of Zhou (died 697 BC)
 Huan Yi, Qin general
 Emperor Huan of Han (132–168)
 Sun Huan (Jiming) (194–234), Eastern Wu military general
 Sun Huan (Shuwu), Eastern Wu military general
 Cao Huan (246–302), last emperor of Cao Wei
 Huan Wen (312–373), Jin dynasty general
 Huan Huo (320-377), Jin dynasty general
 Huan Chong (328–384), Jin dynasty governor and general
 Huan Xuan (369–404), warlord who briefly seized the imperial throne
 Gao Huan (496–547), general and minister of Northern Wei and Eastern Wei
 Duke Huan (disambiguation)
 Xie Huan, Chinese painter
 Lee Huan (1917–2010), Taiwanese politician, Premier of the Republic of China
 Liu Huan (born 1963), Chinese singer and songwriter
 Zhang Huan (born 1965), Chinese artist

Other uses
 Huan County, Gansu, China
 Huan River, a tributary of the Yellow River in China
 Huan (Middle-earth), a fictional hound from J. R. R. Tolkien's fantasy writings

See also
 Three Huan, three aristocratic clans, all descendants of Duke Huan of Lu
 Hwan (disambiguation)
 Juan
 Xuan (disambiguation)
 Yuan (disambiguation)